Halil Mutlu (born Halil Aliev on 14 July 1973 in Postnik, Bulgaria) is a former professional Turkish weightlifter with several World and Olympic championship titles. Mutlu is one of the five weightlifters who has achieved three consecutive gold medals at the Olympic Games.

Career
In 1994, he won both the European and world championships, titles that would soon become commonplace for him. He made his first Olympic appearance in 1992 in the 52 kg category and finished fifth. In 1996, in the 54 kg category, the reigning world champion and world record holder, Mutlu broke the world record in the snatch and went on to win the gold medal by 7.5 kg. At the 1999 World Championships he beat silver medal winner Adrian Jigău by around 20 kg and set a new world record. He remained undefeated until the 2000 Olympics in Sydney, where he was even more dominant than he had been in Atlanta. This time he set world records in both the snatch and the clean and jerk and won by 17.5 kg in the 56 kg category.

He was suffering from a shoulder injury in 2003 and temporarily moved to the 62 kg class. His career appeared in doubt after a torn right rotator cuff and ruptured biceps tendon sidelined him for most of 2002.

Mutlu dominated in his weight class since mid-1990s. By the time of the Athens Olympics in 2004, Mutlu won the world championship five times, although he had missed the 2002 season because of injury. In Athens he out lifted Wu Meijin of China by 5 kg in the snatch and then extended his lead in the jerk to earn victory by 7.5 kg. At 31, he captured his third consecutive gold medal at the Olympics in Athens.

Steroid ban
In 2005, Mutlu was banned from international competition by the International Weightlifting Federation for 2 years for use of anabolic steroid Nandrolone, although he insists that he never knowingly took steroids. The Turkish Weightlifting Federation itself had been suspended by the IWF for "repeated anti-doping violations" until May 2006. He pulled out of the 2008 Beijing Olympics stating that he was not able to "lift my targeted weight in practice." As a penalty, he was expelled from the ASKI.

Personal life 
Mutlu is married and has lived in Ankara, Turkey since the early 1990s. He is a member of the Konya Kombassan Club in Konya and is coached by Ibrahim Elmali. Beside weightlifting, Mutlu enjoys wrestling.

Highlights
World junior champion (1993),
Five-time world champion (2003, 2001, 1999, 1998, 1994 - 1st; 1995, 1993 - 2nd.),
Nine-time European champion (2005, 2003, 2001, 2000, 1999, 1997, 1996, 1995, 1994),
25 gold medals (8 Snatch, 8 Clean and Jerk, 9 Total) in total at European Championships, winner of the most gold medals second after David Rigert with 27 gold medals,
Only fourth weightlifter to win three Olympic gold medals (2004, 2000, 1996),
Named as the "Sportsman of the year 1999" in Turkey,
He is one of five men in history to lift three times his bodyweight,

Major results

Medals
Olympics

World Championships

European Championships

CWR: Current world record
WR: World record

See also
Athletes with most gold medals in one event at the Olympic Games

References

External links
 

1973 births
Living people
Bulgarian Turks in Turkey
Bulgarian emigrants to Turkey
People from Momchilgrad
Turkish male weightlifters
Olympic weightlifters of Turkey
Olympic gold medalists for Turkey
Weightlifters at the 1992 Summer Olympics
Weightlifters at the 1996 Summer Olympics
Weightlifters at the 2000 Summer Olympics
Weightlifters at the 2004 Summer Olympics
World record holders in Olympic weightlifting
Olympic medalists in weightlifting
Doping cases in weightlifting
European champions in weightlifting
Medalists at the 2004 Summer Olympics
European champions for Turkey
Medalists at the 2000 Summer Olympics
Medalists at the 1996 Summer Olympics
European Weightlifting Championships medalists
World Weightlifting Championships medalists